The Springs of Lake County, California are natural springs, some of which are warm and/or rich in minerals, in Lake County, California. During the 19th century and the early part of the 20th century resorts were often founded around these springs, where bathing and drinking the water was thought to be beneficial to the health. A partial list follows.

List

Notes

References

Sources